KGH could refer to:

 The Royal Greenland Trading Department (KGH)
 Kalinga language (ISO 639-3 language code KGH)
 Kemira GrowHow (Helsinki Stock Exchange symbol KGH)

Hospitals 
 Kelowna General Hospital in Kelowna, British Columbia, Canada
 Kettering General Hospital, Northamptonshire, England 
 King George Hospital, Visakhapatnam, India
 Kingston General Hospital in Kingston, Ontario, Canada

Places 
 King George Hub, Surrey, British Columbia, Canada
 Kinghorn railway station, Scotland, station code
 Kogarah railway station, Sydney, Australia, station code
 Kew Gardens Hills, Queens, New York, USA